is a former Japanese football player.

Playing career
Uemura was born in Kagoshima Prefecture on December 3, 1966. After graduating from Tokai University, he joined Toyota Motors. In 1992, he moved to Kyoto Shiko (later Kyoto Purple Sanga). He played many matches as goalkeeper until 1994. However the club gained former Japan national team goalkeeper Shinichi Morishita in 1995. So, Uemura he could hardly play in the match behind Morishita from 1995 and retired end of 1996 season.

Club statistics

References

External links

sports.geocities.jp

1966 births
Living people
Tokai University alumni
Association football people from Kagoshima Prefecture
Japanese footballers
Japan Soccer League players
J1 League players
Japan Football League (1992–1998) players
Nagoya Grampus players
Kyoto Sanga FC players
Association football goalkeepers